Odhran O'Dwyer is a Gaelic footballer from County Clare. He plays at senior level for the Clare county team and won a Tommy Murphy Cup in 2004. He also played for Ireland in the 2003 International Rules Series.

At club level, he plays with Kilmurry Ibrickane. He won Clare Senior Football Championship in 1993, 2002, 2004, 2008, 2009 and 2011, 2012, and he also won two Munster Senior Club Football Championship and played in the 2010 All-Ireland Club Championship final.

References

External links
http://munster.gaa.ie/history/sfclub_teams/

Year of birth missing (living people)
Living people
Clare inter-county Gaelic footballers
Irish international rules football players
Kilmurry Ibrickane Gaelic footballers